Skyland Resort is a hotel and resort in Shenandoah National Park in Virginia.  

The Skyland Resort, originally called Stony Man Camp, was built in 1895 at what later became the highest point on the Skyline Drive, with a sweeping view of the Shenandoah Valley at 3,680 feet.  It was built in 1895 by George Freeman Pollock, a young Washington, DC man whose father owned a great deal of the land surrounding the resort. Skyland was intended to be a place where the affluent people from major cities would come to relax and recreate. Early in its life, it was advertised as a dude ranch. When it opened, transportation was by horse or wagon. It competed with the nearby Panorama Resort, which opened in 1924.

Around 1931, it was taken over by the Shenandoah National Park, and the Skyline Drive was built past it. Rather than destroying the improvements to restore the natural environment as was the practice in most parts of the Park as it was established between 1924 and 1936, Skyland's accommodations were expanded, and are available to visitors today.

Gallery

External links
Shenandoah National Park — Skyland
Skyland Commercial Website 
Skyland Lodge, Skyland, Page County, VA at the Historic American Buildings Survey (HABS)
National Park Service — "Why Not Panorama?" - Article about a similar SNP resort that has long been destroyed

Hotels in Virginia
Shenandoah National Park
Hotels established in 1895
1895 establishments in Virginia
Historic American Buildings Survey in Virginia